Originally opened on November 1, 1979, as Center for the Arts, the Singletary Center for the Arts is a fine arts complex located on the campus of the University of Kentucky in Lexington, Kentucky. Nearly eight years after its opening, on April 16, 1987, Center for the Arts was dedicated to and renamed after the eighth president of the University, Dr. Otis A. Singletary, becoming henceforth known as the Singletary Center for the Arts.

As part of the College of Fine Arts and essential to the UK School of Music, the Singletary Center for the Arts’ mission is to host artistic, cultural and educational events for the University community, Lexington community and the Commonwealth of Kentucky.Additionally, the Singletary Center provides professional, full-service venues for the creation, practical application, and dissemination of artistic, cultural and educational expressions by international, national, regional, university, and student performers, artists, and speakers.

Since its opening in 1979, The Singletary Center for the Arts has served over 3.7 million patrons and has come to host over 400 events annually. Among these 400 annual events, Singletary plays host to a variety of musical performances spanning genres such as orchestral, choral, jazz, rock, world, and bluegrass music as well as dance, comedy, and lecture events. Some notable performers and speakers at Singletary include jazz legend Herbie Hancock, the Moscow Ballet, comedian Bill Burr, author David Sedaris, and many more.

References

External links
UK Singletary Center for the Arts

Buildings and structures completed in 1979
Buildings at the University of Kentucky
Tourist attractions in Lexington, Kentucky
Performing arts centers in Kentucky
University and college arts centers in the United States